The men's 3000 metres steeplechase event at the 2017 Summer Universiade was held on 27 August at the Taipei Municipal Stadium.

Results

References

3000
2017